Letícia Bufoni e Silva (born April 13, 1993) is a Brazilian-American professional street skateboarder. She is a six-time X Games gold medalist.

Early life
Bufoni was born in São Paulo. She began skating at age nine, and her grandmother bought her first skateboard when she was 11.

"I grew up in the street playing sports all the time. We didn't have computers, no smartphones. All of the kids started skating, so I did too."

"My dad broke my board so I wouldn't skate anymore. I started to skateboard when I was nine years old; I was skating with all the guys in my neighborhood, and he was mad at me because I was the only girl in the middle of 10 guys. He smashed my board in front of me and said; You're not skating anymore, ever again." Her father eventually relented.

At the age of 14, Bufoni moved to the United States with older friends. She attended Hollywood High School, but left after missing so much school that she was in danger of being expelled.

Career
In 2007, Bufoni competed in her first X Games at the age of 14 in Los Angeles.

She is a five-time X Games gold medalist. She tied Elissa Steamer's decade-old record for most gold in Women's SKB Street with her win at XG Shanghai 2019. Overall she earned six straight medals in X Games Women's SKB Street (2010–2014) and the title at Shanghai 2019.

She has become one of the world's best-known and most influential action sports athletes.
Bufoni was ranked the #1 women's street skateboarder by World Cup of Skateboarding four years in a row 2010–2013 and appeared in  The Guinness Book of World Records (2017) for the "Most Wins Of The World Cup of Skateboarding. In 2013, she was nominated for an ESPY Award – Best Female Action Sports Athlete.

In 2015, she won the first Street League Skateboarding Women's SLS Super Crown World Championship in Chicago, IL. She also appeared in the ESPN Magazine – The Body Issue. She was also the first female skater to sign for Nike SB in 2015.

In 2018, Forbes named Bufoni one of  The Most Powerful Women In International Sports for 2018 (#25) and made Sports Pro Media's list for The World's Most Marketable Athletes for 2018 (#41). Further in 2018, she was named to the  Forbes Brazil "Under 30" list. She has 3.4 million followers across Instagram, Facebook and Twitter.

Bufoni is the official athlete representative for World Skate, the International Olympic Committee-recognized governing body for Skateboarding.

Personal life 
On April 7, 2021, Bufoni became a citizen of the United States.

Competitions 

 2015 – 1st Place: Far'n High Women's Finals – Paris, France
 2015 – 1st Place: Excellent Mystic Skate Cup Women's Street – Prague, Czech Republic
 2015 – 1st Place: Street League Super Crown Women's Finals – Chicago, USA
 2016 – 1st Place: Far'n' High Women's Finals – Paris, France – Paris, France
 2016 – 1st Place: Mystic Sk8 Cup Women's Open – Prague, Czech Republic
 2016 – 2nd Place: Street League Super Crown Women's Finals – Los Angeles, USA
 2017 – 3rd Place: X Games Minneapolis Skateboard Street – Minneapolis, USA
 2017 – 2nd Place: Street League Super Crown Women's Finals – Los Angeles, USA
 2018 – 1st Place: X Games Norway Skateboard Street – Oslo, Norway
 2018 – 2nd Place: World Cup of Skateboarding Street – Vigo, Spain
 2018 – 2nd Place: X Games Skateboard Street – Sydney, Australia
 2019 – 1st Place: X Games Skateboard Street – Shanghai, China
 2019 – 2nd Place: Dew Tour – Long Beach, California, USA
 2021 - 1st Place: X Games Skateboard Street - Vista, California, USA

Awards
Nickelodeon 2016 Kids' Choice Sports – Queen Of Swag 

Cartoon Network 2014 Hall of Game Awards – She Got Game

Video game appearances 
Bufoni is a playable character in the video game Tony Hawk's Pro Skater 5.

She is also in the new game Tony Hawk Pro Skater 1 & 2, a remastered and updated version of the original Pro Skater games with an updated roster of playable skaters.

Music video appearances 
Bufoni plays a featured role in the music video for "Snapback" by Old Dominion.

References

External links 
 Leticia Bufoni on Twitter
 Verified profile on Instagram
 Verified profile on Facebook
 Leticia Bufoni athlete profile 
 The GIZMO interviews: Leticia Bufoni on Thrasher
 Leticia Bufoni: I'm going to skate forever on ESPN
 On the perils of skating naked for Rolling Stone
 This is Leticia Bufoni's life less ordinary on redbull.com
 Leticia Bufoni XGames profile
 Red Bull Roller Coaster
 Leticia Bufoni in the Nine Club with Chris Roberts

1993 births
Living people
Brazilian expatriate sportspeople in the United States
Brazilian skateboarders
Female skateboarders
Naturalized citizens of the United States
Olympic skateboarders of Brazil
Skateboarders at the 2020 Summer Olympics
Sportspeople from São Paulo
X Games athletes